The Russian National Freestyle Wrestling Championships 2021 (also known as the Russian Nationals 2021) was held in Ulan-Ude, Buryatia by the Russian Wrestling Federation at the Sport complex of Buryatia Republic between 11 March to 14 March 2021.

Medal table

Men's freestyle

See also 

2020 Russian National Freestyle Wrestling Championships
2019 Russian National Freestyle Wrestling Championships
2018 Russian National Freestyle Wrestling Championships
2017 Russian National Freestyle Wrestling Championships
Soviet and Russian results in men's freestyle wrestling

References 

Russian National Freestyle Wrestling Championships
2021 in sport wrestling
2021 in Russian sport
Wrestling